Compsocladium is a genus of lichen-forming fungi in the family Ramalinaceae. It has two species.

Species
Compsocladium archboldianum 
Compsocladium kalbii

References

Ramalinaceae
Lichen genera
Lecanorales genera
Taxa described in 1956